On 7 January 2015, a car bomb was detonated in front of a police academy in the Yemeni capital Sana'a, killing at least 38 people and injuring more than 60 others. This was the third major attack in the country in less than a month, after the deadliest attack in the country during 2014, as well as the second major bombing in less than a month, after the 2014 Rada' bombings and the 2014 Ibb bombing.

The attack took place on the same day as the Charlie Hebdo shooting in Paris, France, which was also allegedly carried out by Yemeni al-Qaeda.

Bombing
The bombing took place early in the morning and targeted a large group of Houthi fighters and civilians standing near the entrance of a police officers' academy in central Sana'a. The area contains the country's central bank and the Defense Ministry, itself the site of a major bombing in December 2013.

The powerful blast destroyed parts of nearby buildings and killed dozens instantly. Witnesses reported large plumes of smoke rising from the area after the attack. Emergency officials were struggling to deal with a large number of seriously injured and warned that casualty numbers may rise further. According to officials, most of the victims were young men waiting to enroll at the academy, as well as many police cadets. No group claimed immediate responsibility for the bombing, although it is suspected to be the work of Al-Qaeda.

References

2015 murders in Yemen
Attacks in Asia in 2015
Explosions in 2015
Terrorist incidents in Yemen in 2015
Mass murder in 2015
Car and truck bombings in Yemen
21st century in Sanaa
Yemeni Civil War crimes
January 2015 crimes in Asia
January 2015 events in Asia
Crime in Sanaa